The Dahra Range is a mountain range located in northern Algeria. 'Dahra' is an Arabic word meaning 'back'; in toponymy this term indicates a long plateau of lesser altitude.

Geography
The Dahra is a low mountain chain part of the greater Tell Atlas which stretches from Algiers in the east along the Mediterranean coast until reaching the mouth of the Chelif near Mostaganem at its western end. Its tallest summit is 1,550 m high Mount Zaccar, north of Miliana, a town built on its slopes. The inhabitants of the area of the range are Berber people.

The range is partly covered in Mediterranean forest, with scattered patches of cultivation.

The inhabitants of the Dahra Range are from Berber origin, descending from the Banou Ifren and the Maghraouas

References

External links 
Massif des Dahra - Couleurs d'Algérie
 Pleistocene Mazouna Stage in Western Algeria Containing Artifacts

Mountain ranges of Algeria